Eric Butorac and Jean-Julien Rojer were the defending champions but were eliminated in the second round by Robin Haase and Viktor Troicki. Andy Murray and Jamie Murray won the title after beating František Čermák and Filip Polášek 6–1, 6–4 in the final.

Seeds

Draw

Draw

References
 Main Draw

Rakuten Japan Open Tennis Championships - Doubles